Chesquerque is a chess variant invented by George R. Dekle Sr. in 1986. The game is played on a board composed of four Alquerque boards combined into a square. Like Alquerque, pieces are positioned on points of intersection and make their moves along marked lines (similarly to xiangqi); as such, the board comprises a 9×9 grid with 81 positions (points) that pieces can move to.

Chesquerque was included in World Game Review No. 10 edited by Michael Keller.

Game rules
The dimensions of the board are 9 rows by 9 columns. All the standard chess pieces are present, plus one additional pawn and one archbishop fairy piece per side. The pieces move in ways specially adapted to the Alquerque-gridded board; these moves differ slightly from those in regular chess.

The starting setup is shown above. Like in standard chess, White moves first and the objective of the game is to checkmate the opponent's king. Other standard chess conventions also apply.

Piece moves
Each chesquerque piece has two different sets of possible valid moves, depending on whether said piece is standing on a point that has one or more diagonal connections ("with diagonals") or one that has no diagonal connections ("without diagonals"). In general pieces cannot move diagonally from points without diagonal markings.

 A rook can move orthogonally any number of points in a straight line, as in standard chess. On a point with diagonals, though, a rook can also move one step diagonally.
 A bishop, on a point with diagonals, can move diagonally any number of points in a straight line. A bishop can also move one step orthogonally (on any point).
 The queen combines the powers of a chesquerque rook and a chesquerque bishop: i.e. it can move any number of points in a straight line, in any available direction along marked lines.
 The king moves one step as a chesquerque queen: i.e. it can move one step in any direction along marked lines.
 In castling moves, the king always slides three points' distance (whether castling  or ""); the corresponding rook moves two squares in the opposite direction.
 A knight can move in a similar way to a regular chess knight (described below), but unlike standard chess, a chesquerque knight may not jump over any pieces standing in the way:
 On a point without diagonals, a knight moves in the following pattern: one step orthogonally (in any direction), then one step diagonally outward.
 On a point with diagonals, a knight moves in the following pattern: one step diagonally (in any direction), then one step orthogonally outward.
 The archbishop combines the powers of a chesquerque bishop and a chesquerque knight. (Note that when making a knight's move, the archbishop still cannot jump over any piece that stands on an adjacent point; however, an enemy piece on such a point may be captured by a bishop's move.)
 A pawn has two types of moves:
 On a point with diagonals, a pawn moves (without capturing) one step straight forward, and captures one step diagonally forward.
 On a point without diagonals, a pawn moves and captures one step forward.
 As in standard chess, all pawns may optionally advance two steps straight forward on their first move (without capturing). En passant captures are also possible (but only against pawns that start on points without diagonals). Pawns are promoted at the last , and may be promoted to an archbishop as well.

See also
 Alquerque
 Also by George Dekle:
 Masonic Chess
 Triangular Chess—a variant with triangular cells
 Tri-Chess—a three-player variant with triangular cells, chancellors and cardinals
 Trishogi—a shogi variant with triangular cells
 Hexshogi—a shogi variant with hexagonal cells

Notes

References

Bibliography

External links
 Chesquerque by Peter Aronson, The Chess Variant Pages

Chess variants
1986 in chess
Board games introduced in 1986